Rakovica railway station is a railway station of Belgrade railway junction, Belgrade–Niš and Belgrade–Požarevac railway. Located in Rakovica, Belgrade. Railroad continues to Resnik in one, in the other direction to  Belgrade Center, in the third direction to Belgrade marshalling yard "B", in fourth direction to Jajinci and the fifth direction towards to Topčider. Rakovica railway station consists of 7 railway tracks.

See also 
 Serbian Railways

References 

Railway stations in Belgrade
Rakovica, Belgrade